was a Japanese director, screenwriter and editor of films and television advertisements. He began his filmmaking career as a pioneer of Japanese experimental films before transitioning to directing more mainstream media, and his resulting filmography as a director spanned almost 60 years. He is best known as the director of the 1977 horror film House, which has garnered a cult following. He was notable for his distinct surreal filmmaking style, as well as the anti-war themes commonly embedded in his films.

Early life

Obayashi was born on 9 January 1938 in the city of Onomichi, Japan. After his father, a doctor, was called to the battlefront during World War II, he was raised in his early infancy by his maternal grandparents. Through his childhood and adolescence, Obayashi followed many artistic pursuits, including drawing, writing, playing the piano, and possessed a growing interest in animation and film. He made his first 8 mm film in 1944 at the age of 6, the hand-drawn animated short Popeye's Treasure Island.

Career

1955–1977: Early career and House
In 1955 Obayashi, at the urging of his father, began procedures to enter medical school and become a physician. However, he abandoned the prospect of a career in medicine in favor of following his artistic interests at Seijo University. In 1956 he was accepted to the university's liberal arts department, where he began to work with 8 and 16 mm film. Toward the end of his stay at the university Obayashi began working on a series of short experimental films. Together—with Takahiko Iimura, Yoichi Takabayashi, and Donald Richie—Nobuhiko Obayashi established the Japanese experimental-film group Film Independent, or "Japan Film Andepandan," who were awarded at the 1964 Knokke-Le-Zoute Experimental Film Festival. Along with works by other filmmakers such as Shuji Terayama and Donald Richie, Obayashi's films would develop the tone of Japanese experimental cinema through the 1960s. In these early experimental films Obayashi employed a number of avant-garde techniques that he would carry into his later mainstream work. Though these films tended to be of a personal nature, they received public viewership due to distribution by the Art Theatre Guild.

Following his departure from university, Obayashi continued to work on his experimental films. Dentsu, a TV commercial project in Japan looking for new talent, asked members of Film Independents if they would like to direct commercials; Obayashi was the only one from the group to accept the offer, and thus began earning a living as a director in the new field of television advertisements. Obayashi's TV commercials had a visual appeal similar to that of his experimental works. In the 1970s he began a series of Japanese ads featuring well-known American stars such as Kirk Douglas, Charles Bronson and Catherine Deneuve. During the course of his career, Obayashi directed around 3,000 television commercials. He made his feature film directorial debut with the horror film House, released in 1977. The film employed a mixture of trick photography and avant-garde techniques to achieve its distinctive, surreal visuals, and has gone on to be considered a cult classic. It earned Obayashi the Blue Ribbon Award for Best New Director.

1980s–2010s: Further mainstream success
Through the 1980s and onwards Obayashi continued to make feature films and broadened his mainstream appeal. He directed a number of coming-of-age films such as I Are You, You Am Me (1982), The Girl Who Leapt Through Time (1983), and Lonely Heart (1985)—which together form his "Onomichi trilogy", named after the town where he was born—as well as Chizuko's Younger Sister (1991).

His 1988 film The Discarnates was entered into the 16th Moscow International Film Festival. His 1998 film Sada, based on the true story of Sada Abe, was entered into the 48th Berlin International Film Festival, where it won the FIPRESCI Prize for "its unique combination of innovative style and human observation."

In 2016, Obayashi was diagnosed with stage-four terminal cancer and was only given a few months to live. Despite this, he started production on Hanagatami, a passion project of his which had been over 40 years in the making. The film was released in 2017 and was met with acclaim, winning prizes such as the Best Film Award at the 72nd Mainichi Film Awards. It is the third installment in a thematic trilogy of modern anti-war films by Obayashi, along with Casting Blossoms to the Sky (2012) and Seven Weeks (2014).

He shot and edited his final film, titled Labyrinth of Cinema, while receiving cancer treatment. Labyrinth of Cinema premiered at the 2019 Tokyo International Film Festival.

Death
Obayashi died on 10 April 2020 at the age of 82, from lung cancer in Tokyo. His family held a funeral for him at a temple in Tokyo on 13 April.

Honors
 Medal with Purple Ribbon (2004)
 Order of the Rising Sun, 4th Class, Gold Rays with Rosette (2009)
 Person of Cultural Merit (2019)

Partial filmography

References

Bibliography

External links
 

Japanese film directors
1938 births
2020 deaths
Deaths from lung cancer in Japan
Fantasy film directors
Horror film directors
People from Hiroshima Prefecture
People from Onomichi, Hiroshima
Persons of Cultural Merit
Recipients of the Medal with Purple Ribbon
Recipients of the Order of the Rising Sun, 4th class
Science fiction film directors